The annual Cambridge Carnival International festival uses the Trinidad and Tobago model to bring together Cambridge’s diverse community for a spectacular annual costume parade and celebration. This year’s festival features five entertainment zones in Kendall Square: two live music stages, KidsFest zone, and two DJ zones.  The Cambridge Carnival has come a long way since 1992 from a small street fair at University Park, to now one of the most spectacular events in the Greater Boston area. Cambridge Carnival is one of twenty-four North American Caribbean-style Carnivals that Carnival followers seek out. It is not only an event that the diverse Cambridge community can be proud of; it also recognized internationally and has attracted bus-loads of out-of-towners from as far a field as New England, Baltimore, New York City, and Maine, as well as visitors from overseas.  The event attracts more than 100,000 people.

External links
Cambridge Carnival International official website

Cambridge, Massachusetts
Carnival in the United States
Caribbean-American history
Trinidadian and Tobagonian-American culture